Baidera is a single-species fungal genus in the family Roccellaceae. It contains the species Baidera mauritiana, a corticolous (bark-dwelling), crustose lichen found in Mauritius. Both the genus and species were described as new to science in 2020 by Paul Diederich and Damien Ernst.

References

Roccellaceae
Lichen genera
Taxa described in 2010
Arthoniomycetes genera